Felipe de Alba (April 29, 1924 – November 15, 2005) was a Mexican attorney and character actor from the 1940s and 1950s. He appeared in films such as Robinson Crusoe (1954, directed by Luis Buñuel) and Real Women Have Curves (2002).

De Alba was briefly married to the actress Zsa Zsa Gabor. The wedding, however, was declared invalid, since the actress's prior marriage to Michael O'Hara had not been properly dissolved. The de Alba-Gabor union was annulled and they did not stay together.  De Alba relocated to New York City, and died there in 2005.

Personal life 
His marriage to Zsa Zsa Gabor is one of the shortest celebrity marriages in history. They were married 13 April 1983 but it was annulled the next day on 14 April 1983.

Filmography

References

External links

|-
!colspan="3" style="background:#C1D8FF;"| Husband of a Gabor Sister

1924 births
2005 deaths
20th-century Mexican male actors
20th-century Mexican lawyers
Mexican emigrants to the United States